Road Rules: Latin America is the seventh season of the MTV reality television series Road Rules. It took place in Latin America in the countries of Mexico, Belize and Costa Rica, as well as the United States of America. The Handsome Reward was a Volkswagen New Beetle, which all five remaining cast members received in the finale (Sanabria was removed from the show before this point).

Cast

Missions

Episodes

During filming
In Episode 6, Gladys and Abe got into a violent shouting match in the hotel over Abe’s hook-up with Susie (from Road Rules: Down Under) the previous evening.  When Gladys physically attacked Abe and scratched his face, she was sent home for breach of contract.

In Episode 7, Tom Arnold and his wife made a surprise appearance taking the roadies out on their boat for a fishing “competition”.  Brian caught the only fish (a small one) but over the course of the day Tom served an important role performing as mediator over the Gladys/Abe fallout and healing some of the leftover wounds.

After filming
In 2011, Holly Shand married Justin Darcy. The couple has two daughters.

On March 29, 2018, Brian Lancaster died at the age of 43. Though the cause of death was not immediately confirmed, TMZ confirmed that Lancaster had a history of heart failure and arrhythmia.

The Challenge

Challenge in bold indicates that the contestant was a finalist on The Challenge.

Note: Gladys Sanabria served as a host on Challenge 2000.

References

External links
 

Road Rules
1999 American television seasons
Television shows filmed in Costa Rica
Television shows filmed in Mexico
Television shows filmed in Belize